"My Old Man's a Dustman" is a song first recorded by the British skiffle singer Lonnie Donegan. It reached number one in the British, Irish, Australian, Canadian, and New Zealand singles charts in 1960. The chorus of the song is:

Composition
The song was written by Lonnie Donegan, Peter Buchanan (Donegan's manager between 1956 and 1962), and Beverly Thorn; Thorn was not credited on the original release. According to his autobiography, Beverley Thorn was a pseudonym of Leslie Bricusse, the songwriter who wrote hit shows with Anthony Newley.

It probably has its origins in "My Father Was a Fireman", a song sung by British World War I troops. The two songs share a lyrical similarity in their reference to "cor blimey trousers". A song beginning with the line "My old man's a dustman", but otherwise sharing no lyrics with Donegan's, is recorded as a playground song in the 1956 novel My Old Man's a Dustman by Wolf Mankowitz. This song tells of the exploits of the protagonist at the Battle of Mons. A version concerning a football game and beginning "My old man's a scaffie [dustman or street-sweeper, from scavenger]/He wears a scaffie's hat" (echoing the first two lines of Donegan's song) is recorded as a Scottish playground song during the 1950s. A very similar song, beginning "My old man's a baker", is recorded in Chester-le-Street in 1967. All of these songs share the same metric structure.

The melody is borrowed from the theme starting at around 2 minutes and 20 seconds into the music for the ballet Petrushka, composed by Igor Stravinsky.

The song represented a change in style for Donegan, away from American folk and towards British music hall.

Single release
On 16 March 1960, through Pye Records in the UK, Donegan released a version of the song recorded live at the Gaumont cinema in Doncaster just a few weeks earlier, on 20 February. The B-side was a version of the English folk song "The Golden Vanity". The single reached number one in the UK Singles Chart on 31 March and maintained that position for four weeks. It also reached number one in Ireland, Australia and New Zealand and on the Canadian CHUM Chart, selling over a million copies in total.

Cover versions

In 1960, a Dutch version was released by Toby Rix. Also in 1960, a parody version, "My Old Man's An All-Black", was released in New Zealand by the Howard Morrison Quartet The song was performed by the Bee Gees on the Australian TV show Bandstand in 1963, and, in the US, the Smothers Brothers included a parody based on the song on their LP Think Ethnic. In 1966, The Irish Rovers included a version of the song on their LP The First of the Irish Rovers.

A version titled "My Old Man's a Provo" became one of the most popular Irish republican rebel folk songs in the latter part of the twentieth century.

The tune to the chorus has become a popular football chant in recent years. For example, Arsenal supporters sang "Arsene Wenger's magic, he wears a magic hat, and when he saw the double, he said "I'm having that!" at the end of their double winning season in 2002; Chelsea fans later adopted it after ex-Arsenal player Cesc Fabregas assisted the Blues in securing a double of their own in 2015.

References

Number-one singles in Australia
Number-one singles in New Zealand
UK Singles Chart number-one singles
1960 singles
1960 songs
Pye Records singles
Lonnie Donegan songs